The 2003–04 season was the 8th edition of Europe's premier basketball tournament for women - EuroLeague Women since it was rebranded to its current format

Regular season

Group A

Group B

Knockout stage

Quarterfinals
Game 1 was played 2 March 2004. Game 2 was played 5 March 2004. Game 3 was played 10 March 2004. The team that won two games first, advanced to the Final four.

Final four
The venue was on 4–6 April 2004. Pécs hosted the event at the Lauber Dezső Sportcsarnok.

References

External links
 FIBA Europe

    
2003–04